Leif Sundell (born February 15, 1958 in Borlänge) is a retired Swedish association football referee. Sundell refereed a total of 262 Allsvenskan games, the Swedish top tier in football, in 22 years. He also refereed 100 international games during his career; two of those were matches played during UEFA Euro 1996 in England. In the quarter-final Germany versus Croatia (2:1) he gave a penalty kick and a red card against Croatia.

References

1958 births
Living people
Swedish football referees
UEFA Euro 1996 referees